Kenny Brightbill (born January 20, 1948), nicknamed the "Shillington Slingshot" and "Mr. Excitement" is a former NASCAR and professional dirt modified driver from Sinking Spring, Pennsylvania. He has won 441 career professional races and is a member of the National Dirt Late Model Hall of Fame, the NYSSCA Hall of fame, the Eastern Motorsports Press Association Hall of Fame, the Reading Fairgrounds Speedway Historical Society Home of Champions Hall of Fame the Northeast Dirt Modified Hall of Fame, the YCRC Hall of Fame, and is also the all time wins leader of Reading Fairground Speedway with 135 career wins. …
“lBrightbill has won many of the most noted races for dirt track modifieds in the Northeastern United States, most notably 1988 Syracuse Miller High Life 300.

Early life
Brightbill was born in Reading Pennsylvania, the son of Helen Irene (Long) and Elmer Samuel Brightbill. He began his racing career in 1967 at the age of 19, at that time the local speedway had the minimum racing age of 21 years old. Kenny could not wait 2 more years to get on the track so he told the race officials he was in fact 21. In honor of his stretch of the truth he choose to make his race number (#19) to honor his real age at the time of 19.

Legacy
Although Brightbill scored over 441 wins at 41 different tracks all over the world, Brightbill's major notoriety stems from his popularity and dominance at Reading Fairgrounds Speedway. From his first Reading victory April 17, 1970 through June 24, 1979, 2nd to last race at the Fairgrounds, Brightbill won 135 times. In that nine year period, there were 480 feature races. Brightbill’s Reading record: 135 wins, 303 top-five finishes, 352 top-tens, and four championships earned Brightbill a large number of fans in and around Berks County. Additionally he won the Eastern States 200 in 1980, Super DIRT Week Syracuse 200 in 1988, 4 track championships and 43 wins at East Windsor Race Track, 37 wins at Susquehanna Speedway, 30 victories and 2 titles at Bridgeport Speedway, 29 wins at New Egypt Speedway, 8 wins at Grandview Speedway and the 1978 championship at Flemington Speedway. Kenny also gave dirt late model racing a try, registering 13 victories.

NASCAR career
Brightbill raced in 6 NASCAR Winston Cup Series races in his career, finishing with three top-tens. His first race came in 1974 at Pocono Raceway. It was a great achievement for the rookie NASCAR driver, who almost finished the race but ended up falling fall laps short to record a 10th-place finish. He then raced at Dover International Speedway later that season and finished 8th. He only had one NASCAR start in 1975, once again at Dover, racing for Donlavey Racing. It was the best day of Brightbill's NASCAR career, as he started 13th, finished all but 20 laps, and recorded his NASCAR best 7th-place finish. Brightbill did not race another NASCAR race until 1977, making 2 starts for car owner Jim Makar. He proved his racing skills were still superior, finishing every lap but the final six to end with a 12th place finish. He then raced in Dover, not fairing as well with a 40th place finish. His last career NASCAR race was in 1978 at Pocono Raceway. Brightbill started 26th in the field of 40, and ended the race finishing 23rd.

Motorsports career results

Winston Cup Series

Career win list

Wins by track

References

External links
 

NASCAR drivers
People from Shillington, Pennsylvania
1948 births
Living people
Racing drivers from Pennsylvania
People from Sinking Spring, Pennsylvania